West Fork Furnace is a historic iron furnace and national historic district located near Floyd, Floyd County, Virginia.  The district includes structural, landscape and archaeological components of a small and well preserved mid-19th-century iron furnace built about 1853. The components consist of the furnace, retaining wall, staging area, head race, wheel pit, tail race, and East Prong of Furnace Creek. The furnace remained in operation until 1855.

It was listed on the National Register of Historic Places in 2009.

References

Industrial buildings and structures on the National Register of Historic Places in Virginia
Historic districts on the National Register of Historic Places in Virginia
Buildings and structures in Floyd County, Virginia
National Register of Historic Places in Floyd County, Virginia
Industrial buildings completed in 1853
Industrial furnaces